The Mask of Dimitrios is a 1939 novel by Eric Ambler.  In the United States it was published as A Coffin for Dimitrios.

The book is sometimes regarded as Ambler's finest, however this is disputed.

Ambler's discussions with Turkish exiles in Montparnasse provided some of the inspiration for the book.

The character Charles Latimer also features in The Intercom Conspiracy.

Plot

Mystery writer Charles Latimer meets Colonel Haki of the Turkish police. Haki believes Latimer would be interested in the career of the notorious criminal Dimitrios, whose body has been identified in an Istanbul morgue.  Latimer, who is indeed intrigued, begins an independent investigation of the details of Dimitrios' criminal career, and learns some information about it which is more dangerous than he had anticipated. He soon finds himself fighting for his life against a ruthless, capable enemy.

Reception & Adaptation
The book has received positive reviews. The Wall Street Journal called it "a startling, elegant masterpiece of espionage fiction." The Pequod described it as "a first-rate book, with lucid prose, complex characters, and a well-structured plot," and rated the book a 9.5 out of 10. On the crime fiction website Crime Reads, the editor and columnist Neil Nyren said, "I’ve worked with many writers of international suspense, and whenever I’ve wanted to recommend a book to any of them that captures the genre as well as any book possibly can—this is the one I send them to." The book has been adapted as a radio play and made into a feature-length film, The Mask of Dimitrios.

References

1939 British novels
British spy novels
British thriller novels
British adventure novels
British novels adapted into films
Novels by Eric Ambler
Novels set in Istanbul
Novels set in Athens
Novels set in Geneva
Novels set in Paris